Enrico Baj (October 31, 1924 – June 15, 2003) was an Italian artist and writer on art. Many of his works show an obsession with nuclear war. He created prints, sculptures but especially collage.  He was close to the surrealist and dada movements, and was later associated with CoBrA. As an author he has been described as a leading promoter of the avant-garde. He worked with Umberto Eco among other collaborators. He had a long interest in the pseudo-philosophy 'pataphysics.

Biography 
He was born in Milan into a wealthy family, but left Italy in 1944 having upset the authorities and to avoid conscription. He studied at the Milan University law faculty and the Brera Academy of Art.

In 1951 he founded the arte nucleare movement with Sergio Dangelo, which unlike abstract art was overtly political. Baj himself was aligned with the anarchist movement. His most well-known pieces are probably the series of "Generals": absurd characters made from found objects such as belts or medals.

He made numerous works using motifs from other artists, from Leonardo da Vinci to Picasso. Sometimes he recreated entire works of other painters.

In 1972 public display of a major work, Funeral Of The Anarchist Pinelli (a reference to Carlo Carrà's  painting The Funeral of the Anarchist Galli of 1911), was banned after the murder of the police officer believed to be responsible for Giuseppe Pinelli's death in custody. However his work continued to be political. In 1989 he designed thirty marionettes for Le Bleu-blanc-rouge et le noir, an opera by Italian composer Lorenzo Ferrero to a libretto by Anthony Burgess, written for the bicentenary of the French Revolution. In his last years he created a series of paintings in protest at the election of Silvio Berlusconi. He died in Vergiate, Italy.

References

External links
 Obituary
 Biography of Enrico Baj - looking in detail at his anarchist politics
 Enrico Baj, June 15, 2003 Daily Bleed Calendar
Selected works by Enrico Baj  NO!art groupe
:it:Pittura Nucleare The Italian page for the arte nucleare
 Discussion of Fire! Fire! by Janina Ramirez and Ricky Martin of Art Ninja: Art Detective Podcast, 15 Mar 2017

1924 births
2003 deaths
Artists from Milan
20th-century Italian painters
Italian male painters
21st-century Italian painters
Italian anarchists
Italian contemporary artists
Brera Academy alumni
Italian surrealist artists
Puppet designers